The Assa (Tsirtslovn-Tskhali) is a right tributary of the Sunzha in Georgia and Russia. It is located in Dusheti Municipality of Mtskheta-Mtianeti, Georgia; and in Dzheyrakhsky and Sunzhensky Districts of Ingushetia and in Sunzhensky and Achkhoy-Martanovsky Districts of Chechnya, Russia.

Geography
The basin includes the major part of Ingushetia, areas in the west of Chechnya, as well as minor areas in the north of Georgia. Within the river basin, more than 70% of the territory is subjected to avalanches.

The river's source is on the northern slopes of the Greater Caucasus in Khevsureti from where it flows north and crosses into Russia. The Assa accepts the Gulaykhi from the right and flows through the Erzi Nature Reserve. North of the stanitsa of Nesterovskaya, the Assa turns east, crosses into Chechnya, flows through the stanitsa of Assinovskaya, and accepts the Fortanga from the right. The mouth of the Assa is at the locality of Zakan-Yurt. The principal tributary of the Assa is the Fortanga (right).

The Assa and Terek also flow through the Republic of Ingushetia in a south to north direction. The Assa, Terek and Gulaykhi river valleys are known for their large complex of stone battle towers and dwellings, burial crypts, pagan sanctuaries, and Christian churches". The Ingushes  culture of the North Caucasus, one of the ancient cultures, is well preserved here by the Dzhairakha-Assa state historical and architectural museum. The village of Alkhaste is situated on the river's left bank, while the rural locality of Samashki is located on the river's outskirts. The village of Alkun is split in two by the river; Lower Alkun is inhabited by Ingush, while Upper Alkun is inhabited by Orstkhoy.

The climate in the river valley is characterized as having a frequent drying effect which supports special microzones.

History
Finds included an iron bar and working of native gold.

Though construction of a railway tunnel was envisaged from Georgia to Russia in the 1980s, including passage through the Assa River valley, construction was suspended a decade later.

Reservation
The upper reaches of the Assa and the Armhi have been combined into a natural reservation called the Jeyrakh-Assa museum-reserve, which has canyon valleys. Its historical importance is due to the medieval Christian Temple of 12th century and several other structures of Bronze Age (9th through 6th centuries BC), 300 towers of the 16th and 17th centuries which are habitable and where battles were fought, and 18 human habitats including 200 vaults dated to the same era. For these historical reasons, the Jeyrakh-Assa Reservation has been proposed to be inscribed as a UNESCO World Heritage Site.

See also 
Jeyrakh-Assa museum-reserve
Asa Managed Reserve

References

Rivers of Chechnya
Rivers of Ingushetia
Rivers of Georgia (country)
International rivers of Asia
International rivers of Europe